Stalag VII-A (in full: Kriegsgefangenen-Mannschafts-Stammlager VII-A) was the largest prisoner-of-war camp in Nazi Germany during World War II, located just north of the town of Moosburg in southern Bavaria. It served also as a transit camp through which prisoners, including officers, were processed on their way to other camps. At some time during the war, prisoners from every nation fighting against Germany passed through it. At the time of its liberation on 29 April 1945, there were 76,248 prisoners in the main camp and 40,000 or more in Arbeitskommando working in factories, repairing railroads or on farms.

Camp history 
The camp was opened in September 1939 and was designed to house up to 10,000 Polish prisoners from the German September 1939 offensive. The first prisoners arrived while the wooden barracks were under construction and for several weeks lived in tents.

British, French, Belgian and Dutch soldiers taken prisoner during the Battle of France started arriving in May 1940. Many were transferred to other camps, but close to 40,000 French remained at Stalag VII-A throughout the war.

British, Greek and Yugoslavian prisoners arrived from the Balkans Campaign in May and June 1941. A few months later Soviet prisoners started arriving, mostly officers. At the end of the war there were 27 Soviet generals in the prison.

More British Commonwealth and Polish prisoners came from the North African campaign and the offensive against the Italian-held islands in the Mediterranean. They were brought from Italian POW camps after the Armistice with Italy in September 1943, including many who escaped at that time and were recaptured. Italian soldiers were also imprisoned.

The first American arrivals came after the Tunisia Campaign in December 1942, and the Italian Campaign in 1943. Large numbers of Americans were captured in the Battle of the Bulge in December 1944.

Among the last arrivals were officers from Stalag Luft III who had been force-marched from Sagan in Silesia (now Żagań), Poland). They arrived on 2 February 1945. They were followed by more prisoners marched from other camps threatened by the advancing Soviets, including American officers who had been marched from Oflag 64 in Szubin, via Oflag XIII-B, under their senior officer Lt.Col. Paul Goode.

During the 5½ years, about 1,000 prisoners died at the camp, over 800 of them Soviets. They were buried in a cemetery in Oberreit, south of Moosburg. Most died from illness, some from injuries during work.

On 1 August 1942 Major Karl August Meinel was shifted into the Führerreserve, because on 13 January 1942 he wrote a critical report to General Hermann Reinecke on the segregation and execution of Russian prisoners of war in Stalag VII-A by the Gestapo and the Sicherheitsdienst SD (security service) of the Reichsführer SS (Heinrich Himmler).

Liberation 
Stalag VII-A was captured on 29 April 1945 by Combat Command A of the 14th Armored Division. A German proposal for an armistice was rejected, followed by a short, uneven battle between the American tanks and retreating German soldiers for control of bridges across the Amper and Isar rivers. The German contingent included "remnants of the 17th SS Panzer Grenadier and 719th Infantry Divisions...which had no tanks or antitank guns, and were armed with only small arms, machine guns, mortars, and panzerfausts". Large numbers surrendered, as did the camp's 240 guards. The American force learned of the existence of the camp and its approximate location only a few hours before the attack. Because so many Allied POWs were in the area, the U.S. artillery, a major factor in any attack, was ordered not to fire, and remained silent during the attack.  According to official German sources, there had been 76,248 prisoners at the camp in January 1945.

Aftermath 
After the liberation Stalag VII-A was turned into Civilian Internment Camp #6 for 12,000 German men and women suspected of criminal activity for the Nazi regime. Later the camp was turned into a new district of the town called Moosburg-Neustadt. One of the old huts has been restored.

A memorial to inmates of Stalag VII-A was built. It is a fountain located in the center of Neustadt. It consists of four bas-reliefs created out of local stone by the French sculptor  while he was a prisoner in the camp.

In 1958 the Oberreit cemetery was closed. 866 bodies were exhumed and reburied at the military cemetery in Schwabstadl near Landsberg. The bodies of 33 Italians were reburied at the Italian Memorial Cemetery near Munich. In 1982 the Moosburg City Council purchased a plot at the site of the old Oberreit cemetery and erected a wooden cross with a simple stone remembering the dead of  Stalag VII-A.

Notable prisoners 

 Derek Bond, M.C., Grenadier Guards
 John Allen Dixon Jr., 505th Parachute Infantry Regiment, later Chief Justice of the Louisiana Supreme Court
Jack Hemingway, Canadian-American fly fisherman,  conservationist, and writer. Son of American novelist and Nobel Prize-laureate Ernest Hemingway.
 Lincoln Hudson, U.S. Tuskegee Airmen fighter pilot
 George J. Iles, U.S. Tuskegee Airmen fighter pilot
Alexander Jefferson, U.S. Tuskegee Airmen fighter pilot
 Armour G. McDaniel, U.S. Tuskegee Airmen fighter pilot
 Richard A. Radford, British Eighth Army in North Africa; later IMF economist
 Vito Trause, U.S. 34th Infantry Division
 John Waddy OBE, British Parachute Regiment, later Colonel SAS

See also
 List of prisoner-of-war camps in Germany
 Stalag
 Karl von Eberstein - SS officer who helped fire Meinel after he objected to POW killings
 Gestapo - responsible for 'screening' POWs to be murdered

References

Further reading
 Bond, Derek, M.C., (1990) Steady, Old Man! Don't You Know There's a War On? Leo Cooper (Pen & Sword) 
 Dann, John (2018) A Welsh Uncle, Memories of Tom Morgan 1898–1957,

External links
 Diaries by Sapper Roger Collinson RE whilst a prisoner of World War II, 1943 to 1945
 The Wartime Memories Project : Stalag 7A POW camp
 Stoker Harold Siddall, RN, captured on Crete and his life in Stalag VII-A

 

Stalag VII-A